Vaasthavam is a 2006 Indian Malayalam-language romantic political crime drama film written by Babu Janardhanan and directed by M. Padmakumar. The film revolves around a youth Balachandran Adiga (Prithviraj Sukumaran) and follows his rise and fall in politics. The story is loosely based on Thakazhi's novel Enippadikal.

Prithviraj won the Kerala State Film Award for Best Actor for his performance, making him the youngest recipient of the award at age 24.

Plot

Raghavan Master, a scion of a high Adiga Brahmin family and an ardent communist, is now in crisis as his Tharavadu is devoid of the fame and fortune it once had. Balachandran, is his only son, who has the burden of looking after the family and his four sisters. He is aware of the difficulties involved in bringing the family back from the brink of nothingness and in marrying off his sisters.

Balachandran's eldest sister Shobha does some tailoring and manages a low earning with which the family is kept out of hunger. Balachandran is engaged to Sumithra his cousin. But in the turn of events Thripran Namboodhiri comes with an offer to marry his niece to Balachandran, agreeing to ensure that he secures a job in the secretariat as his name is in the rank list which would expire soon and thereby save his family from dire straits. Sumithra forces Balachandran to give up their dreams for the sake of his family.

He marries Surabhi, a girl from a rich family, to tackle the serious economic adversities that his family faces. Notwithstanding the family chaos, Balachandran's younger sister Shubha walks out with Adivasi leader Sreedharan on the day of Balachandran’s marriage, causing irreparable damage to the family reputation, following which his mother dies. Sumithra marries a cruel and corrupt police officer who constantly doubts the character of his wife.

At this juncture, Balachandran joins the job at the Secretariat. He lives with seventy-year-old Unnithan Asan who acts as his guide all through the corruption-filled secretariat. His financial needs force him to become a corrupt officer who is always in the lookout for money and power. He deliberately pretends to be a bachelor, to encourage the affections of Vimala, a divorcee and his colleague. With the help of Vimala, the niece of the new revenue minister Pattam Raveendran, Balachandran is posted in the minister's personal staff and quickly climbs the ladder of bureaucracy. What follows next is a series of events that turns Balachandran's mind so as to tear off his new life and go back to his native to lead a simple, peaceful life with Surabhi and his family.

Cast

Soundtrack

The movie features and acclaimed soundtrack composed by Alex Paul and lyrics penned by Gireesh Puthanchery.

Reception
The movie received positive reviews from critics.

Awards
Kerala State Film Awards
 Kerala State Film Award for Best Actor – Prithviraj Sukumaran
 Kerala State Film Award for Best Editor – L. Bhoominathan

References

External links 
 

2006 films
2000s crime films
2000s Malayalam-language films
Films shot in Thiruvananthapuram
Films directed by M. Padmakumar